SMIC may refer to:
The SMIC Private School, in Shanghai
Semiconductor Manufacturing International Corporation, in Shanghai
 , the minimum wage in France
Special Material Identification Code, a logistics management code used in association with the NATO Stock Number
Server Management Interface Chip, part of Intelligent Platform Management Interface (IPMI)
Missionary Sisters of the Immaculate Conception of the Mother of God, a Roman Catholic religious order